The 2017 NAB AFL Under 18 Championships was the 22nd edition of the AFL Under 18 Championships. 

For the previous two decades, the Under-18 Championships had been split into two divisions – with traditional football regions Vic Metro, Vic Country, Western Australia and South Australia in the top tier division one and Queensland, NSW-ACT, Tasmania and the Northern Territory in division two. However, with the growth in the strength of the northern academies, the division two carnival was changed to a five-round competition between the four academy clubs (Brisbane Lions, Gold Coast Suns, Greater Western Sydney Giants, Sydney Swans), Tasmania and the Northern Territory. The AFL believed the developing depth in Queensland and NSW-ACT had made the division two carnival uneven in recent years, with a gap growing between those states and Tasmania and the NT. Also, the academy-based format allowed more players in the northern clubs' under-18 systems to impress at a higher level.

An Australian Alliance side (made up of players from the division two competition) was introduced as a division one team. This was designed to give the best prospects from those regions the opportunity to play at a national level in the division one carnival, which took place after the academy series was finished. Thus, division one was made up of 5 teams - Australian Alliance, South Australia, Vic Country, Vic Metro and Western Australia - playing each other across 5 rounds. 

Vic Metro won the division one title for the second year in a row, with Western Australian, Oscar Allen winning the Larke Medal as the division one best player. Sydney Swans academy member Nick Blakey won the Hunter Harrison Medal for the best player in the Under 18 Academy Series (Formerly Division 2).

Fixture

Division 1

All-Australian team
The 2017 All-Australian team

References

Under-18